Cudonigera houstonana, the juniper budworm moth, is a species of moth of the family Tortricidae. It is found in North America, where it has been recorded from Arizona, California, Kansas, Mississippi, New Hampshire, New Jersey, New Mexico, North Carolina, Oklahoma, Tennessee and Texas.

The wingspan is about 20 mm. Adults have a mottled tan and brown colour pattern on their wings, resembling dead foliage of the host plant. Adults have been recorded on wing from April to November. There are up to two generations per year.

The larvae feed on the foliage of Juniperus ashei. They construct silken tubes. Pupation occurs in the larval shelter. The species overwinters in the larval stage.

References

Archipini
Moths described in 1873
Moths of North America
Taxa named by Augustus Radcliffe Grote